Vespoidea is a superfamily of wasps in the order Hymenoptera, although older taxonomic schemes may vary in this categorization, particularly in whether to recognize the superfamilies Scolioidea (for scoliid wasps) or Formicoidea (for ants). Vespoidea includes wasps with a large variety of lifestyles: eusocial, social, and solitary habits, predators, scavengers, parasitoids, and some herbivores.

Description 
Vespoid wasp females have antennae with 10 flagellomeres, while males have 11 flagellomeres. The edge of the pronotum reaches or passes the tegula. Many species display some level of sexual dimorphism. Most species have fully developed wings, but some have reduced or absent wings in one or both sexes. As in other Aculeata, only the females are ever capable of stinging.

Phylogenetics and taxonomy
Research based on four nuclear genes (elongation factor-1α F2 copy, long-wavelength rhodopsin, wingless and the D2–D3 regions of 28S ribosomal RNA—2700 bp in total) suggests the historical view of family relationships need to be changed, with Rhopalosomatidae as a sister group of the Vespidae and the clade Rhopalosomatidae + Vespidae as sister to all other classical vespoids and apoids. In a study in 2008, the superfamily Apoidea was found to nest within the Vespoidea, suggesting the dismantling of Vespoidea (sensu lato) into many smaller superfamilies: Formicoidea, Scolioidea, Tiphioidea, Thynnoidea, and Pompiloidea in addition to a much more narrowly defined Vespoidea (restricted to Rhopalosomatidae and Vespidae). Their research also found families Mutillidae, Tiphiidae, and Bradynobaenidae to be paraphyletic.

A later study in 2013 confirmed the need for revision of high-level relationships, and the pattern of sister-group relationships within the putative Vespoidea largely matched the same basic pattern as the 2008 study. This study also noted a paraphyletic Bradynobaenidae and Tiphiidae.

The extinct family of Armaniidae also was formerly considered to be a group of "ant-like wasps" and was also classified under Vespoidea. However, additional work by Borysenko in 2017 found these species to be basal members of Formicidae, placing three genera under Sphecomyrminae and considering the rest incertae sedis.

Families retained in Vespoidea 
 Rhopalosomatidae – rhopalosomatid wasps
 Vespidae – paper wasps, hornets, potter wasps, yellow jackets, and relatives

Families represented by Formicoidea 
 Formicidae - ants

Families represented by Pompiloidea 
 Mutillidae – velvet ants/velvet wasps
 Myrmosidae – myrmosid wasps
 Pompilidae – spider wasps
 Sapygidae – sapygid wasps

Families represented by Scolioidea 
 Scoliidae – scoliid wasps

Families represented by Tiphioidea 
 Bradynobaenidae – bradynobaenid wasps
 Sierolomorphidae – sierolomorphid wasps
 Tiphiidae – tiphiid wasps

Families represented by Thynnoidea 
 Chyphotidae – chyphotid wasps
 Thynnidae – thynnid wasps

References

External links

 
Apocrita superfamilies